The Census (Amendment) (Scotland) Act 2019 is an act of the Scottish Parliament. The act made provisions for the inclusion of sexual orientation and transgender status in the Census.

Provisions
The provisions of the Act include:
Amending the Census Act 1920 to add sections regarding transgender status and sexual orientation which would add questions on these topics to the next census.

See also

United Kingdom census, 2021
Census (Return Particulars and Removal of Penalties) Act 2019 - a similar Act for England, Wales and Northern Ireland

References

Acts of the Scottish Parliament 2019
Law of the United Kingdom
2021 United Kingdom census
2019 in Scotland
2019 in British law
Transgender law in the United Kingdom
Demographics of Scotland
2019 in LGBT history